Kalliyoor  is a village in Thiruvananthapuram district in the state of Kerala, India.

Demographics
 India census, Kalliyoor had a population of 36836 with 18176 males and 18660 females.

References

Pincode-695042

Villages in Thiruvananthapuram district